Damone is a given name. Notable people with the name include:

Damone Brown (born 1979), American basketball player
Damone Clark (born 2000), American football player
Damone Johnson (born 1962), American football player

See also
Damon (given name)
Damone (disambiguation)